Tibagi is a municipality in the state of Paraná in the Southern Region of Brazil.

With the vast territory, its economy is based on agriculture and it is considered the largest wheat producer in Brazil and also stands out as one of the largest producer sin the cultivation of grains such as corn, beans and soybeans.

Tourism is part of the largest local economic strengths, from the famous Carnival, to the natural beauties of lapo river and the (Guartelá Canyon) which is considered to be the 6th largest canyon in the world, besides rivers, waterfalls, and hills. For these features Tibagi is the favorite destination of many extreme sports fans who like rafting mountain climbing, parasailing and others.

The municipality contains the  Guartelá State Park, created in 1992 to protect the scenic Guartelá Canyon of the Iapó River.

See also
List of municipalities in Paraná

References